Chris Atkinson (born 30 November 1979 in Bega, New South Wales, Australia) is a professional rally driver. In the World Rally Championship (WRC), Atkinson drove for the Subaru World Rally Team between 2004 and 2008. His best finish on an individual WRC event is second, which he achieved at the 2008 Rally México and Rally Argentina. Other podium placings include third-place finishes at the 2005 Rally Japan and the 2008 Monte Carlo Rally.

Atkinson drives for Team MRF, and competed in the 2012 Asia-Pacific Rally Championship and made a guest appearance in the World Rally Championship. Atkinson won the 2012 Asia-Pacific Rally Championship.

On 16 August 2012, it was announced that Atkinson would be the number one driver for the WRC Team Mini Portugal outfit for the last five races of the 2012 WRC season.

Early career
Prior to his motorsport career, Atkinson had a career as a stockbroker. He graduated at Bond University in commerce, majoring in finance and accounting in 1999 after receiving an academic scholarship for studies. Atkinson  was a co-driver for his brother Ben, but after attending a rally school with his brother, the pair swapped positions, scoring a class win and third overall. Atkinson's brother, Ben Atkinson, is a co-driver for Cody Crocker in APRC.

For his first full season of competition, Atkinson contested the Australian Rally Championship aboard a privately entered Group N Mitsubishi Lancer Evo, finishing inside the top ten in Group N and in the overall top 20 on every round he contested, as well as setting two second-fastest stage times. The Atkinsons finished ninth outright to become Privateer Champions. This performance brought Atkinson to the attention of Suzuki, who offered him the opportunity to drive one of its Super 1600 Ignis models with the Suzuki Sport team in the 2003 Asia-Pacific Rally Championship.

WRC career

Atkinson's first world rally was in 2004 at the Rally New Zealand in a Subaru Impreza WRX STI. For 2005, he was signed by Subaru World Rally Team to drive the Subaru Impreza WRC alongside 2003 world champion Petter Solberg. He finished 12th overall in the drivers' world championship with 13 points. His best results were third in Japan and fourth in Australia.

After finishing the 2006 season tenth overall in the drivers championship with 20 points and a fourth place as his best finish, Subaru told Atkinson that his job was on the line, and if he could not balance his speed with safety and achieve quality results he would be replaced by another driver.

At the start of the 2007 season Atkinson finished fourth at the 2007 Rally Monte Carlo, recording three stage wins. On the final day of the rally, Atkinson was 0.8 seconds behind fourth place man Mikko Hirvonen and had to beat him in the super special stage, a 2.4 km run through Monaco which uses part of the world-famous Formula One course. Hirvonen set a time of 1:50.9 meaning that Atkinson had to at least set a time of 1:50.1 to beat him, but Atkinson did better and took the stage win with a time of 1:49.9. Hirvonen was the first person over to Atkinson to congratulate him.

At the 2007 Rally Finland, Atkinson posted the fastest time on the short opening super special stage on a horse-racing course at Killeri, to lead the rally for a short time. Atkinson finished the 2007 season seventh overall in the drivers' world championship.

At the beginning of the 2008 season, Atkinson took third place in Monte Carlo; while at the 2008 Corona Rally Mexico, Atkinson managed second, 30 seconds ahead of Jari-Matti Latvala. He finished the season fifth in the drivers' standings, and for the first time, outscored hitherto team leader Solberg.

After Subaru's season-ending announcement of its withdrawal from the WRC, Atkinson signed for the new Citroën Junior Team for the 2009 season. In his only rally for the season with the team in Ireland, he produced a strong showing to finish fifth, despite colliding with a telegraph pole during the first day, and suffering a spin on SS18.

Re-entry into WRC (2012)
After signing with Monster World Rally Team in 2012, Atkinson raced alongside Ken Block in Mexico. Atkinson won a stage, SS12 – Leon Super Special but finished with a DNF due to mechanical failure.

Atkinson also signed up for a one-off drive in a Citroën DS3 WRC for the Qatar World Rally Team for Rally Finland. However, his medium term WRC future was granted when it was announced he would replace Armindo Araujo as the lead driver for the factory-backed WRC Team MINI Portugal in the last five rallies of the 2012 season.

Atkinson contested the last five rounds of the 2012 WRC season with the Motorsport Italia-run MINI squad to finish the year 13th in the Championship. His best result for the year was achieved at Rallye Deutschland (Rally Germany) where he secured 5th behind the wheel of the MINI John Cooper Works WRC.

Atkinson was snapped up by the Citroën team for 2013, however, the team only used him for Rally Mexico, where he finished 6th, 11 minutes off the winner (Sebastien Ogier). Hyundai hired him mid-year as a test driver for their i20 rally car, which led to a part-time deal for 2014. In 2014 he raced at the rallies of Mexico and his home event in Australia, finishing 7th and 10th respectively. In both events, Atkinson was the last of the Hyundai drivers.

Regional series
In April 2010, Chris Atkinson began a partnership with the Proton R3 Rally Team. Competing in the Asia-Pacific Rally Championship (APRC), Atkinson drove a Proton Satria Neo Super 2000, alongside co-driver Stephane Prevot.

After making a guest appearance at the Intercontinental Rally Challenge (IRC) Monte Carlo Rally, Atkinson has dominated the 2011 APRC, winning the Malaysian Rally, Rallye de Nouvelle Caledonia and the International Rally of Whangarei. However missing round two in Queensland and the final round in Hokkaido saw him finish second to his teammate Alister McRae who competed in all rounds.

Atkinson competed in an Australian-run Skoda in the 2012 FIA Asia-Pacific Rally Championship, driving for the MRF team in a Skoda Fabia S2000, co-driven by regular wingman Stephane Prevot and the pair were crowned 2012 FIA Asia-Pacific Rally Champions.

In 2014, Atkinson signed with FAW-VW Rally Team from China. He competed with a S2000 with two rallies. At the end of 2014, with the coming of FAW-FW Golf 7 SCRC, Atkinson restarted his prominence in CRC (China Rally Championship). In the debut of the Golf 7 SCRC, Atko won by 25 mins in the penultimate rally of 2014 CRC in Longyou. And in the Wuyi, the last one, he did not give the champion away. For 2015 and 2016, Atko won 9 of 11 in CRC, defeating the Subaru Rally Team China driver Mark Higgins. However, CRC does not count the points achieved by a foreign driver, or he would surely be the Driver's Champion of CRC in 2015 and 2016.

2015: Guiyang (1st), Zhangye (Ret, Mark Higgins won), Beijing (1st), Dengfeng (1st), Longyou (1st), Wuyi (1st), Jixi (3rd, Jari Ketomaa won)

2016: Dengfeng (1st), Zhangye (1st), Jinzhong (1st), Changchun (1st)

Other racing
At the 24 Hours Nürburgring in 2006, Chris made his circuit racing debut driving a Subaru Impreza for the Autosportif Racing UK placing second in class. From that lead a drive in the 2007 Bathurst 12 Hour again in a Subaru Impreza where he finished first in class and second outright. In 2009 he competed in the third round of the Australian Mini Challenge co-driving with two-time Fujitsu V8 Supercar Series Champion Steve Owen finishing second in the 30-minute endurance race.

Atkinson competed in the final four rounds of the 2016 Global RallyCross Championship, finishing the championship in 11th in a campaign that included a finals appearance in Seattle. He is likely to stay in rallycross for 2017, whether it be in the GRC or the World Rallycross Championship.

Complete WRC results

APRC results

Complete Global Rallycross Championship results
(key)

Supercar

Complete Americas Rallycross Championship results

Supercar

Career highlights

2012 – Winner, Asia-Pacific Rally Championship
2011 – 2nd, Asia-Pacific Rally Championship
2010 – 5th, Asia-Pacific Rally Championship
2009 – 14th, World Rally Championship
2008 – 5th, World Rally Championship
2007 – 7th, World Rally Championship
2006 – 10th, World Rally Championship
2005 – 12th, World Rally Championship
2004 – Winner, Asia-Pacific Super 1600 Championship
2004 – Second, Australian Rally Championship
2003 – Winner, Asia-Pacific Super 1600 Championship
2002 – Winner, Australian Privateers Cup

References

 Subaru World Rally Team Official Site
 Plenty of Rallies for Chris Atkinson in 2011

External links

 Chris' official website
 SWRT Profile on Chris Atkinson
 Driver Database stats

1979 births
Living people
Australian rally drivers
Bond University alumni
Intercontinental Rally Challenge drivers
People from the South Coast (New South Wales)
Racing drivers from New South Wales
World Rally Championship drivers
Global RallyCross Championship drivers
Citroën Racing drivers
Hyundai Motorsport drivers